Mankiewicz is a patronymic surname of Polish and Ruthenian origins, and it is also common among Polish Jews.

Note: the letters "a" and "o" are interchangeable. Mankevičius and Monkevičius are the same.

People with the name 
 Francis Mankiewicz (1944–1993), Canadian film director, screenwriter and producer
 Mankiewicz family, an American family of film and media professionals
 Melman Mankiewicz III, male giraffe from Madagascar franchise

Patronymic surnames
Polish-language surnames